Zholsuchus is a genus of crocodyliform that may have been a goniopholidid mesoeucrocodylian, but is only known from scanty material (a right premaxilla, one of the bones of the tip of the snout). This specimen was found in the Coniacian-age Upper Cretaceous Bissekty Formation of Dzharakhuduk, Uzbekistan. Zholsuchus was described in 1989 by Lev Nesov and colleagues.  The type species is Z. procevus.  

A 2000 review by Glenn Storrs and Mikhail Efimov designated Zholsuchus a dubious name, while a 2022 study found that Zholsuchus is a valid taxa by the traits assigned to the specimens assigned to Zholsuchus, and showed affiliations with crown-group crocodylians.

References

Late Cretaceous crocodylomorphs of Asia
Turonian life
Fossils of Uzbekistan
Bissekty Formation